Mompha propinquella is a moth in the family Momphidae found in Europe.

Description
The wingspan is 10–12 mm.  Adults are on wing from the end of June to mid-September in one generation per year.

The larvae feed on great willowherb (Epilobium hirsutum) and broad-leaved willowherb (Epilobium montanum), mining the leaves of their host plant. The mine consists of a large full depth blotch in the lower leaves and the larva can make several mines. Most frass is deposited in coarse grains. The larvae are brownish red with a black head and can be found in early spring. Pupation takes place inside the mine or in the ground. The species overwinters in the larval stage.

Distribution
It is found in most of Europe, except the Mediterranean islands and most of the Balkan Peninsula.

References

Momphidae
Leaf miners
Moths described in 1851
Moths of Europe
Taxa named by Henry Tibbats Stainton